David Baker (born 1944) is a prolific British space author and self-described space scientist. His description
of his career is that he first visited the US in 1962 and returned to work for NASA on the Gemini, Apollo and Space Shuttle programs between 1965 and 1984 as a Mission Planning and Analysis Department. He reports that he was present at NASA during Apollo 13 in 1970.

He returned to the UK in 1984 and set up an independent consultancy helping countries around the world including India to develop and integrate commercial space technologies for their national space programmes.

He now works as a journalist, writer and an author. He has published thousands of articles, more than 100 books and contributed to many radio and TV documentaries about space missions in the US and Europe. In the past, he has edited the Aerospace Review, Jane's Aircraft Upgrades and Jane's Space Directory. He is a fellow of the British Interplanetary Society (BIS) and from 2011 until his resignation in 2021 he was the editor of the BIS's monthly journal, Spaceflight.

Allegations of fraud 
On 18 March 2021, David Whitehouse, a science journalist and former BBC News science editor, raised allegations on Twitter that Baker's reported professional credentials and Apollo career history were fraudulent. The BIS issued a statement on 21 March that it was aware of these allegations, and that the Society would "re-consider any impact of these allegations on the Society". On 25 March 2021, Baker resigned as editor of Spaceflight.

Bibliography 
 The Race for Space – The Story of the space race in six volumes written with co-author Anatoly Zak (2018)
 The Apollo Missions: The Incredible Story of the Race to the Moon (from 29 June 2019)

References 

1944 births
Living people
British male journalists
British space scientists